Igor Dima (born 11 February 1993) is a Moldovan footballer who plays as a forward. He most recently played for Sfântul Gheorghe Suruceni.

References

Living people
1993 births
Moldovan footballers
FC Sheriff Tiraspol players
FC Tiraspol players
FC Saxan players
Speranța Nisporeni players
CS Petrocub Hîncești players
Moldovan Super Liga players
Association football forwards
FC Sfîntul Gheorghe players